The David Clayton-Thomas Show is a Canadian television music miniseries which aired on CBC Television in 1973.

Premise
The series was produced shortly after David Clayton-Thomas's departure from Blood, Sweat and Tears. Each episode featured three parts, a studio performance, a jam session and a production number.

The title sequence of the episodes featured Clayton-Thomas chauffeured in a Rolls-Royce as he travelled to the studio. Other musicians featured on the series were members of bands such as Dr. Music, Lighthouse and Motherlode. Trevor Lawrence was the series conductor and musical arranger.

Scheduling
This half-hour series was broadcast on Mondays at 7:30 p.m. from 25 June to 9 July 1973.

References

External links
 
 

CBC Television original programming
1973 Canadian television series debuts
1973 Canadian television series endings
1970s Canadian television miniseries